Qarwa' is a sub-district located in Jihanah District, Sana'a Governorate, Yemen. Qarwa' had a population of 7125 according to the 2004 census.

References 

Sub-districts in Jihanah District